Kathy M. Lohmer (born January 15, 1954) is an American politician and former member of the Minnesota House of Representatives. A member of the Republican Party of Minnesota, she represented District 39B, which includes portions of Washington County in the eastern Twin Cities metropolitan area, from 2010-2018. She is the founder of a homeschool cooperative and she and her husband are also small business owners. She was previously a medical office administrator.

Minnesota House of Representatives

Lohmer was first elected to the House in 2010 and was re-elected in 2012, 2014, and 2016. She ran for re-election in 2018 but was unseated by Democratic challenger Shelly Christensen.

Personal life
Lohmer is an active volunteer in her community and church. She started support groups for the Spina Bifida Association, and has worked with the Boy Scouts and Courage Youth Sports, an organization that helps disabled kids play a variety of sports, from wheelchair basketball to track and field and floor hockey. She is a "Blue Star Mom," and a member of the Blue Star Mothers Club.

References

External links

 Project Votesmart - Rep. Kathy Lohmer Profile

1954 births
Living people
People from Stillwater, Minnesota
Republican Party members of the Minnesota House of Representatives
Women state legislators in Minnesota
21st-century American politicians
21st-century American women politicians